Dalton Public Schools  is a public school district in  Dalton, Georgia. Its attendance boundary is the Dalton city limits.

Schools
DPS has six elementary schools, one middle school, and three high schools.

High schools
Dalton High School
The Dalton Academy 
Dalton Junior High School

Middle schools
Hammond Creek Middle School

Elementary schools
Blue Ridge Elementary School
Brookwood Elementary School
City Park Elementary School
Park Creek Elementary School
Roan Elementary School
Westwood Elementary School

See also

 Whitfield County School District, which operates public schools serving the remainder of Whitfield County

References

External links

School districts in Georgia (U.S. state)
Education in Whitfield County, Georgia
Dalton, Georgia